Boscawen is a surname of Cornish origin, derived from Boscawen-Un. Notable people with the surname include:

 Arthur Boscawen (1862–1939), Cornish gardener, horticulturist and clergyman
 Charles Boscawen (1627–1689), English politician
 Edward Boscawen (1628–1685), English politician
 Edward Boscawen (1711–1761), British admiral, third son of Hugh Boscawen, 1st Viscount Falmouth
 Edward Boscawen, 1st Earl of Falmouth (1787–1841), British peer and politician
 Evelyn Boscawen, 6th Viscount Falmouth (1819–1889), horse breeder and classic race winner
 Evelyn Boscawen, 7th Viscount Falmouth (1847–1918), British army officer 
 George Boscawen, 3rd Viscount Falmouth (1758–1808), British army officer and statesman
 George Boscawen, 2nd Earl of Falmouth (1811–1852), British peer and politician
 George Boscawen, 9th Viscount Falmouth (1919– ), British peer
 Hugh Boscawen, 1st Viscount Falmouth (c. 1680–1734), British peer and politician
 Hugh Boscawen, 2nd Viscount Falmouth  (1707–1782), British peer and politician
 Hugh Boscawen (1625–1701), British peer and politician

Cornish-language surnames